Walter Magnus Runeberg (29 December 1838 – 23 December 1920)  was a Finnish neo-classical sculptor. He was the son of Finnish national epic poet Johan Ludvig Runeberg.

Biography

Runeberg was born in Porvoo as the eldest son of J. L. Runeberg and his wife, Fredrika Tengström. He studied at the Academy of Fine Arts, Helsinki, and with sculptor Carl Eneas Sjöstrand. From 1858 through 1869 he studied at the Royal Danish Academy of Fine Arts in Copenhagen under Herman Wilhelm Bissen, acquiring a clear influence from the neoclassical style of Bissen's master Bertel Thorvaldsen. He married Lina Elfving (1841–1916) in 1867. They had six children.

After periods living and working in Rome and Paris, Runeberg produced many of Helsinki's best-known examples of monumental public art.  The largest is the Alexander II Monument in Senate Square, a commission awarded jointly to Runeberg and sculptor Johannes Takanen, then completed by Runeberg after Takanen's death in 1885.  The pedestal features several allegorical figures.  Notably, the figure representing Law is a version of the Suomi-neito, the Finnish maiden, here cloaked in bearskin.

He is buried in the Hietaniemi Cemetery in Helsinki.

Works

Statue of Alexander II

Other notable works

See also
Art in Finland
Golden Age of Finnish Art

References 

20th-century Finnish sculptors
19th-century Finnish sculptors
1838 births
1920 deaths
People from Porvoo
Burials at Hietaniemi Cemetery